Dog Creek is a stream in Hickman and Maury counties, Tennessee, in the United States. It is a tributary of Lick Creek.

Dog Creek was so named from an incident when an early settler killed a wolf (he called it a "dog wolf") that was preying on his farm animals.

See also
List of rivers of Tennessee

References

Rivers of Hickman County, Tennessee
Rivers of Maury County, Tennessee
Rivers of Tennessee